The Quarry Lane School is a private, college-preparatory and International Baccalaureate school in California that offers education for students from preschool to twelfth grade. The School was founded by Sabri Arac, who is the current Head of School.

History
The Quarry Lane School was founded in 1991 by Dr. Sabri Arac as an infant/toddler preschool. It added an elementary school at its original Pleasanton, California campus. In 2000, Arac opened a campus in Dublin, California to accommodate the elementary school. The Pleasanton campus served only preschoolers. 

In 2004, Arac opened the second Pleasanton preschool campus, the Pleasanton West campus. In 2005, the Dublin Campus expanded to include a middle school and high school. Its first class graduated in 2010.

The Quarry Lane School offers college preparatory, honors, and AP classes. It offers the East Bay’s only International Baccalaureate (IB) Program in a private setting and offers both IB Diploma and Certificate Programs.

Extracurricular activities

Clubs and activities

Current Upper School clubs include Jazz Band, Chess, Drama, Photography, Journalism, Environmental, Red Cross, and Current Events.

Lower School students also take enrichment courses outside core subjects, which include Engineering, Visual/Fine Art, Computer Science, Spanish, Mandarin Chinese, and Music.

Robotics

Quarry Lane Robotics is offered after school for elementary through high school students. Elementary and middle school students compete in the FIRST Tech Challenge, whereas high school students compete in the FIRST Robotics Competition.

Competitive sports

As of the 2021-22 school year, the following athletics teams were available for high school students: 

 Girls’ volleyball
 Boys’ volleyball
 Co-ed soccer
 Co-ed cross country
 Girls’ basketball
 Boys’ basketball
 Co-ed track and field

As of the 2021-22 school year, the following athletics teams were available for middle school students: 

 Co-ed cross country
 Boys’ soccer
 Girls’ soccer
 Boys’ volleyball
 Girls’ volleyball
 Boys' basketball
 Girls' basketball
 Co-ed track and field

References

External links
The Quarry Lane School - official website
The Quarry Lane School - official student/information website

High schools in Alameda County, California
Private high schools in California
Private middle schools in California
Private elementary schools in California
Educational institutions established in 1991
Dublin, California
1991 establishments in California